Andorra is essentially Catalan speaking. The country has contributed significantly to the Catalan heritage.

Language and literature
The official and historic language is Catalan. Thus the culture is Catalan, with its own specificity.

Two writers renowned in Catalonia and the region, Michele Gazier and Ramon Villero, both come from Andorra. In addition, Ricard Fiter, a renowned writer, not only comes from Andorra, but also serves as the Principality's ombudsman. Yet the tradition of writing in Andorra dates farther back than the 20th century; Antoni Fiter i Rossell, from the parish of Ordino, wrote a history book of his lands called Digest manual de las valls neutras de Andorra in 1748, describing the feudal historical and legal setting of Andorra.

Music

Given the fondness of the Catalans for music, it may not be surprising to hear that Andorra has a Chamber Orchestra directed by the violinist Gérard Claret; and that it also stages an international singing contest supported by the Spanish singer Montserrat Caballé. In 2004, Andorra participated in the Eurovision Song Contest for the first time. This attracted media attention from Catalonia, since it was the first song to be sung in Catalan. The song was eliminated in the semi-finals, and the 2005 and 2006 entries also met the same fate.  In 2009 they were eliminated in the semi finals as well.

Dance
Typical dances, such as the marratxa and the contrapàs, are especially popular at feasts. Among famous feasts are the one honoring Sant Jordi, when books and roses are given as presents; the People's feast, celebrating Saint John and the summer solstice, and the feast of Saint Stephen (Sant Esteve), patron saint of Andorra la Vella. Andorrans tend to celebrate their feasts gladly and loudly.

Media
Andorra's constitution provides for full freedom of the media. There are two daily newspapers published in the principality, Diari d'Andorra and El Periòdic d'Andorra. Television services are broadcast by the public Ràdio i Televisió d'Andorra. Apart from the public Radio nacional d'Andorra, there is also the commercial radio station called Radio Valira.

See also
 List of regional characteristics of Romanesque churches
 Sport in Andorra

References